|}

The Upavon Fillies' Stakes is a Listed flat horse race in Great Britain open to mares and fillies aged three years or older.
It is run at Salisbury over a distance of 1 mile 1 furlong and 201 yards (1,994 metres), and it is scheduled to take place each year in August.

Records
Most successful horse since 1988 (2 wins):
 Chain Of Daisies – 2016, 2018

Leading jockey since 1988 (5 wins):
 Frankie Dettori – Mill Run (1990), Dana Springs (1993), Altamura (1996), Ajhiba (1999), Pictavia (2006)

Leading trainer since 1988 (4 wins):
 Sir Michael Stoute – Rumoosh (1988), Promising Lead (2007), Ave (2009), Mango Diva (2013)

Winners since 1988

See also
 Horse racing in Great Britain
 List of British flat horse races

References
Racing Post:

Flat races in Great Britain
Salisbury Racecourse
Middle distance horse races for fillies and mares